The men's Flyweight (54 kilograms) event at the 1986 Asian Games took place on 30 September 1986 at Sungkyunkwan University, Seoul, South Korea.

A total of eleven competitors from eleven countries competed in this event, limited to fighters whose body weight was less than 54 kilograms. Kim Young-sik of South Korea won the gold medal.

Schedule
All times are Korea Standard Time (UTC+09:00)

Results 
Legend
PTS — Won by points
SUP — Won by superiority

References

External links
Medalists
Results

Taekwondo at the 1986 Asian Games